The Edwards Plateau is a geographic region at the crossroads of Central, South, and West Texas.  It is bounded by the Balcones Fault to the south and east, the Llano Uplift and the Llano Estacado to the north, and the Pecos River and Chihuahuan Desert to the west. San Angelo, Austin, San Antonio, and Del Rio roughly outline the area. The southeast portion of the plateau is known as the Texas Hill Country.

Natural history

The bedrock consists primarily of limestone, with elevations ranging between 100 and 3000 ft.  Caves are numerous.

The landscape of the plateau is mostly savanna scattered with trees. It mostly lacks deep soil suitable for farming, though the soil type is fertile mollisol, so some cotton, grain sorghum, and oats are grown.  For the most part, though, the thin soil and rough terrain areas are primarily grazing regions, with cattle, sheep, and goats (Angora and meat types) predominant.  Several rivers cross the region, which generally flow to the south and east through the Texas Hill Country toward the Gulf of Mexico; springs occur (in wet years), but permanent surface water supplies are sparse throughout the area, except for man-made reservoirs.  The area is well drained; rainwater flows into the Edwards Aquifer recharge zone at the south of the plateau to feed rivers to the south.  Rainfall varies from 15 to 33 inches per year, typically, from northwest to southeast, and the area has a moderate temperature and a reasonably long growing season.

Flora 
Trees of the savanna include junipers (locally called mountain cedar), oak species scattered over grasses, a vegetation type historically shaped by droughts and regular fires. Some pecan trees are found near the springs and rivers, which are typically lined with stands of bald cypress. The Balcones Fault is associated with the Edwards Plateau formation. This fault line is an ecological demarcation for the range definition of a number of species.

Fauna 
Caves of the Edwards Plateau are important habitats for a great deal of wildlife. The area is home to some of the largest colonies of bats in the world, including millions of Mexican free-tailed bats. The largest colony of these inhabits Bracken Cave near San Antonio, while the Congress Avenue Bridge in Austin is the summer home for over half a million (they winter in Mexico) and is the largest bat colony anywhere in an urban area. The Edwards Plateau is home to at least 14 endemic freshwater fishes, including two subterranean species of catfish and 13 fish species considered to be spring-associated. Mechanisms for spring association of fishes is not fully understood, but thought to mediated by water temperature. The large numbers of reptiles and birds also include breeding populations of the Texan endemic golden-cheeked warbler (Setophaga chrysoparia).

Nearly all the natural habitat of the plateau has been converted to ranchland, farmland, or urban areas, such as Austin and San Antonio, with only about 2% remaining in scattered fragments, especially to the east of the plateau. Further alteration to the savanna has incurred though the encroachment of shrubs now that grassland fires are carefully controlled. Small areas of intact habitat remain, particularly around Austin, where areas are protected, such as the Balcones Canyonlands National Wildlife Refuge. Another important area for wildlife is Fort Hood military base.

Human history

Earliest human settlement of this area was by Native Americans.
First it was used and wandered about by Jumano and Coahuiltecan groups, then the Apacheria extended into the Southern Plains by the forerunners of the Lipan and Mescalero Apaches. After the expulsion of the Apachean groups from the Plains by the Comanche, this area was dominated by the Penateka band of the Southern Comanche.

Counties in the Edwards Plateau
According to the Texas Parks and Wildlife Department, all or portions of these 41 counties comprise the Edwards Plateau geographic region:

The Texas Water Development Board, a state government agency, includes additional counties all or partly in the Edwards Plateau area:

A map showing the counties is provided by Texas Parks and Wildlife Department for the Edwards Plateau Ecoregion. The ecoregion is somewhat larger than the geographic region, as the map from Texas Parks And Wildlife includes additional counties that are listed by the Texas Water Development Board, notably the isolated area of Edwards Plateau in Taylor, Runnels, and Nolan Counties that is separated from the main region.

Edwards Plateau gallery

See also
Balcones Canyonlands National Wildlife Refuge
Colorado River (Texas)
Mount Bonnell
List of ecoregions in the United States (EPA)
List of ecoregions in the United States (WWF)

References

External links
 
 
 Texas counties map showing the ecoregion

Landforms of Texas
Plateaus of the United States
Regions of Texas
Tropical and subtropical grasslands, savannas, and shrublands of the United States
Ecoregions of the United States
Geography of Texas
Grasslands of Texas
Texas Hill Country
Physiographic sections